Toyota Motor Manufacturing Kentucky (TMMK) is an automobile manufacturing factory in Georgetown, Kentucky, United States. It is a subsidiary of Toyota Motor North America, itself a subsidiary of Toyota Motor Corporation of Japan. The plant assembles the Toyota Camry, Toyota RAV4, and Lexus ES along with producing engines.

History 
The Toyota Motor Corporation of Japan has been active in the North American market since 1957, made its manufacturing investment in North America in 1972 with the establishment of a company now known as Toyota Auto Body California, and established its first production line in the US in 1986 at NUMMI (New United Motor Manufacturing, Inc.), a joint-venture with General Motors.

After those early ventures, Toyota was ready to establish wholly-owned manufacturing factories in North America.

The company had planned to announce it was establishing a plant in Georgetown, Kentucky (then known as Toyota Motor Manufacturing USA) and another in Cambridge, Ontario as Toyota Motor Manufacturing Canada in news conferences on December 11, 1986 in Kentucky and December 12 in Canada. Instead the news was leaked early by Sen. Mitch McConnell on December 8.

The first vehicle rolled off the production line on May 26, 1988, a prototype 1989 model 4-cylinder Camry. In the beginning, the engines were manufactured at Toyota Kamigo plant in Toyota City, Japan and shipped to TMMK; however, an on-site engine plant was added from 1988 to 1992, increasing the American content to 75%. Employees improved the production process.

TMMK began the production of the Lexus ES sedan beginning in October 2015, adding 50,000 vehicles annually and 750 jobs to the facility. Toyota invested $360 million to accommodate the additional work. "Lexus was founded in the United States, so it is only fitting that we are bringing the production of luxury sedans for our U.S. customers back to where the brand was born," said Akio Toyoda, president of Toyota Motor Corporation. "It is also fitting that we chose Kentucky because it was Toyota's first stand-alone plant in America. So in a way, for manufacturing, Kentucky is Toyota's home. It also has some of the most-experienced Toyota team members in the world." Daniel Lowry, a spokesperson for the Kentucky Cabinet of Economic Development, gave credit to the high quality of Kentucky's workforce, saying Lexus wanted its best people involved in the first U.S. expansion of the brand's manufacturing.

It presently builds the Camry sedan, Lexus ES sedan, and RAV4 Hybrid for the 2023 Model Year. It previously produced the Avalon sedan, Sienna minivan, Venza crossover, and Camry Solara coupe and convertible.  The factory also produces 4-cylinder and V6 engines and powertrain parts. The plant has three automobile assembly lines (two Toyota lines and one Lexus line) with an annual capacity of 550,000 vehicles, and an engine shop with an annual capacity of 600,000 engines. In addition to assembling vehicles and engines, many plastic parts used at TMMK are made at an on-site plastics shop.

Toyota spent $1.33 billion at the facility and added 700 new jobs in 2017 in preparation for the all new 2018 Camry; the first copies of which rolled off the line on 28 June 2017. TMMK is also the first US facility to use Toyota's new TNGA (Toyota New Global Architecture) technology which underpins the 2018 Camry.

Environmental traits 
TMMK was designated as a "zero landfill facility" in 2005. The designation means that all of the waste produced on-site is either recycled or reused and nothing is sent to landfills. Waste is composted, totalling three tons per day with excess capacity — enough that the previous manufacturing headquarters of TEMA, about an hour's drive to the north in Erlanger, Kentucky, would send their waste down for compost.  The headquarters has recently relocated to Plano, TX.

The grounds also sports a very large vegetable garden. In 2005, the produce produced at TMMK helped a nearby charitable organization, God's Pantry, distribute 2.5 million pounds (1100 t) of produce, exceeding its yearly goal by 2 million pounds (930 t). The garden also produces a full crop of pumpkins used at the Toyota Child Development Center for carving at Halloween, and corn which enhances the compost pile.

Products produced

Automobiles 
Toyota Camry (1989–present)
Toyota RAV4 Hybrid (2020–present)
Lexus ES (2016–present)

Engines 
A25A-FKS I4 (2017–present) for Camry
A25A-FXS I4/Electric Hybrid (2017–present) for Camry Hybrid

Former products produced

Automobiles 
Toyota Avalon (1995–2022)
Toyota Avalon Hybrid (2013–2022)
Toyota Camry Solara (2004–2008)
Toyota Sienna (1998–2003)
Toyota Venza (2009–2016)

Engines 
 1AR-FE 2.7 I4 (2009–2016) for Venza
 2AR-FE 2.5 I4 (2009–2017) for Camry
 2AR-FXE 2.5 I4/Electric Hybrid (2011–2018) for Camry Hybrid and Avalon Hybrid
 2AZ-FE 2.4L I4 (2002–2009) for Camry and Camry Solara
 2AZ-FXE 2.4L I4/Electric Hybrid (2006–2011) for Camry Hybrid
 2GR-FE 3.5L V6 (2006–2018) for Camry, Avalon, and Venza
2GR-FKS  V6 (2017–2022) for Camry and Avalon (made elsewhere but shipped in for 2023 Camry)
 1MZ-FE 3.0L V6 (1994–2004) for Camry, Avalon, and Sienna (made elsewhere but shipped in for 2004–2006)
 3MZ-FE 3.3L V6 (2004–2006) for 2004–2006 Camry SE and Camry Solara (made elsewhere but shipped in 2006–2008 for Camry Solara)
 3S-FE 2.0L I4 (1990–1991) for Camry (engines previously made in Japan and shipped in)
 5S-FE 2.2L I4 (1992–2001) for Camry
 3VZ-FE 3.0L V6 (1992–1994) for Camry

See also 

List of Toyota manufacturing facilities

External links

References 

Georgetown, Kentucky
Toyota factories
Motor vehicle assembly plants in Kentucky
1986 establishments in Kentucky